Abdul Rahim Ayoubi (born 1982) is a politician in Afghanistan who is the member of Afghan Parliament since 2010 till 2016 and the president of Afghanistan United Nation Party. In the previous election Ayoubi supported Ashraf Ghani to bring new changes for the nation to face new challenges in the future.

Biography
Abdul Rahim Ayoubi is the son of Abdul Karim Ayoubi and was born in 1982 in Arghistan District, Kandahar Province. His grandfather, Malik Salih Mohammad Ayoubi, was the leader of the Popalzai tribe. He graduated from a high school in Pakistan, where he lived for some years as a refugee. Ayoubi graduated from the Merwais High School in Kandahar in 2010. He had also graduated from the Science College in Quetta, Pakistan, in 1998. He is also a businessman. Ayoubi speaks Pashto, Dari, Urdu and English.

Early years
Ayoubi was in the Ministry of Interior from (2000–2008), and then he joined the Police army and was commander in Ghazni, Zabul, Kandahar, and Helmand, where he was awarded for best deputy and performance. He founded Kakar Construction and Logistics Company in (2009) and was deputy chairman of the Solution Logistics Company (2012).  He became the member of the Wolesi Jirga in 2010, Member of parliament. Official in the Ministry of Interior. Ayoubi survived an attack at Kolola Pushta area in capital Kabul the night of 29 July 2012.

References

External links
 OFFICIAL FACEBOOK PAGE OF ABDUL RAHIM AYOUBI
 ABDUL RAHIM AYOUBI WEBSITE

Living people
Afghan politicians
1982 births